Furlani is a surname. Notable people with the surname include:

 (born 1988), American-born Italian ice hockey player
Erika Furlani (born 1996), Italian high jumper
Valmir Furlani (born 1969), Brazilian footballer

See also
Furlanis